Mount Wood is an isolated nunatak lying northward of David Glacier and 21 km (13 mi) northeast of Mount Kring in Victoria Land. Named by D.B. McC. Rainey of the Cartographic Branch of the New Zealand Dept. of Lands and Survey. Named after the foster parents of Staff Sgt. Arthur L. Kring, United States Marine Corps (USMC), navigator with the U.S. Navy VX-6 Squadron which provided logistic support for the New Zealand Geological Survey Antarctic Expedition (NZGSAE) (1962–63).

Nunataks of Victoria Land
Scott Coast